Kathy's Song can refer to:
 "Kathy's Song", a song by Paul Simon that is included on Paul Simon's album The Paul Simon Songbook and on Simon & Garfunkel's album Sounds of Silence
 "Kathy's Song", a song by Apoptygma Berzerk on the album Welcome to Earth